Shaharah Bridge is an arch bridge in Yemen. It was constructed in 1905 to connect two villages at the top of two mountains in Shaharah District, Amran Governorate, northern Yemen. It is 300 feet deep, 65 feet long, and 9 feet wide. The bridge is the only way that leads to Shaharah town it named after. The bridge is one of the most famous bridges and tourist attractions in Yemen.

See also 
 Shaharah
 Geography of Yemen
 List of wadis of Yemen

References 

Bridges